Deacom, LLC (also known as Deacom) produces enterprise resource planning (ERP) software for manufacturing and distribution companies.

History
Deacom was founded by Jay Deakins in 1995. The company has focused primarily on developing and licensing an ERP software package to manufacturing and distribution clients. Deacom currently has more than 210 employees throughout three offices in Chesterbrook, PA, Denver, CO, and Frankfurt, Germany. The Frankfurt office opened in February 2020 to provide support to customers with European operations. In August 2021, the company was acquired by ECI Software Solutions and now serves as their global platform for the batch and process industry.

Software
Deacom produces a system, referred to as DEACOM ERP, that is designed for manufacturing and distribution companies which include, among other things, food and beverage, pharmaceuticals, cosmetics, sealants, and paints. The system has capabilities specifically for niche industries, such as: warehousing, formulation management, sales management, process manufacturing management, point-of-sale, direct-store-delivery, lot traceability, and forecasting. Since Version 15, the system's architecture is built on a Microsoft technology stack. The ERP system can be deployed either on-premise or hosted in the cloud.

References

External links
 

Software companies based in Pennsylvania
Software companies established in 1995
ERP software companies
Defunct software companies of the United States
1995 establishments in the United States
1995 establishments in Pennsylvania
Companies established in 1995